Esenler Coach Terminal is the central and largest bus terminus for intercity bus service in Istanbul, Turkey. Although the terminus is located in Bayrampaşa district, it is named after Esenler district, which is closer.

The multi-story terminal houses 450-500 permanent parking lots for buses and over 1,000 temporary ones. Average total traffic per day is about 15,000 buses. It also has a capacity of 600,000 passengers a day, with around 3,000 to 5,000 people employed in the terminal.

Around one million passengers pass through it every day.

History

1994-1999 
In 1980, considerations started to build a new terminus on the European side of Istanbul, since the Topkapı bus terminus was becoming increasingly crowded. In 1987, the construction of the new terminus started. In 1994, it entered service. The structure cost $140 million.

2000s–present 
In 2021, the Greater Istanbul Bus Terminal was transferred to İSPARK, a subsidiary of the metropolitan municipality. With the change of the operator of the bus station, a large-scale renovation work was started.

Location 
The terminus is situated on the European side of İstanbul, in Bayrampaşa district. It occupies , which makes it the largest bus terminus in southeastern Europe and in Turkey. It is the third largest in the world. The terminus has 324 platforms.

Services
There are bus services from Esenler Bus Station to all parts of Turkey. Bus companies operating in the bus station also have free shuttles throughout Istanbul. Coaches arrive and depart from almost all Turkish cities. There are also coaches that service neighbouring countries and the rest of Europe.

Connections

 Istanbul Metro line M1 (Yenikapı-Istanbul Atatürk Airport-Kirazlı) at Otogar metro station
 Taxis
 City buses
 Private buses
 Most bus companies have shuttle service by their own minibuses which transport passengers to other parts of Istanbul.

Criticism 
Until the renovation, the bus terminal was criticized for its chaotic and ugly architecture. It had constant bus congestion. The security of the terminus was also a constant worry.

References

External links

 Esenler Bus Terminal bus companies

Bayrampaşa
Buildings and structures in Istanbul
Transport in Istanbul
Transport infrastructure completed in 1994
Transit centers in Istanbul
Bus stations in Turkey
Public transport in Istanbul